Bayfair Shopping Centre, (usually referred to as 'Bayfair' by locals), is the main shopping mall in Mount Maunganui, New Zealand.

Location

Bayfair Shopping Centre is located on the corner of Maunganui Road (State Highway 2) and Girven Road. The rear of the shopping centre backs onto Farm Road, and Jackson Street and Harris Street are located to the side of the building. It is across Maunganui Road from Omanu Golf Course, and across Girven Road from Baywave (a major aquatic complex).

Facilities

Bayfair has three anchor stores; Countdown, Kmart and Farmers. Up until 2018 it was home to New Zealand's only remaining Woolworths supermarket, which was rebranded using the Australian Woolworths logo rather than rebranding to Countdown (like all other Foodtown and Woolworths stores) because there was already a Countdown store in Bayfair. Farmers is the only part of the shopping centre (other than the carpark) to be on more than one floor. There is a large foodcourt with around a dozen food retailers.

Development 
In December 2017, construction began on expanding Bayfair. Where the old Countdown was has been turned into new stores including the Australian makeup & beauty brand Mecca Maxima, and to the left a new larger Countdown Supermarket was built. The Woolworths Supermarket on the Girven Road side was demolished and the first United Cinema in New Zealand is being built in its place.

See also
List of shopping centres in New Zealand

References

External links
 Bayfair Shopping Centre

Buildings and structures in Tauranga
Shopping centres in New Zealand
Shopping centres in the Bay of Plenty Region
Shopping malls established in 1985
1980s architecture in New Zealand
1985 establishments in New Zealand